Phlyarus is a genus of longhorn beetles of the subfamily Lamiinae, containing the following species:

subgenus Bulbophlyarus
 Phlyarus basirufipennis Breuning, 1961
 Phlyarus bulbicollis Breuning, 1951
 Phlyarus thailandensis Breuning & Chujo, 1966

subgenus Phlyarus
 Phlyarus basalis Pascoe, 1858
 Phlyarus cristatus Gahan, 1907
 Phlyarus microspinicollis Breuning, 1963
 Phlyarus multicarinipennis Breuning, 1965
 Phlyarus rufoscapus Breuning, 1976

subgenus Tuberophlyarus
 Phlyarus tubericollis Breuning, 1967

References

Desmiphorini